R. B. Russell is an English publisher, editor, author, illustrator, songwriter, and film maker.

Biography
Russell runs the award-winning Tartarus Press with Rosalie Parker, and for many years compiled the Guide to First Edition Prices. As an author he has had four collections of short stories, three novellas and three novels published. His story "Loup-garou" was chosen for Ellen Datlow’s The Best Horror of the Year. "In Hiding" was nominated for the 2010 World Fantasy Award, and "The Beautiful Room" for the 2011 British Fantasy Award. Michael Dirda has described Russell as "...among the leading practitioners of classic supernatural fiction".

His novella, Bloody Baudelaire, has been filmed by 3:1 Cinema with the new title Backgammon and was released 2016.

He contributes artwork to Tartarus Press titles, and a selection of his art was on display at the Link Gallery, Dean Clough, Halifax, 2010/11.

Russell is also a songwriter, having previously composed songs released by The Bollweevils. His first solo CD, Ghosts, was released by Klanggalerie in February 2012. The accompanying video presentation was premiered in Vienna in March 2012, and was subsequently shown at Dean Clough Galleries October 2012. Dean Clough Galleries presented The Romance of Shortwave Radio Numbers Stations as a video installation in 2018.

Russell was the co-creator of C.W. Blubberhouse with Mark Valentine.

Writing
Guide to First Edition Prices
Eight editions, Tartarus Press, 1996, 1997, 1999, 2001, 2003, 2005, 2007 & 2010.

Short stories
Putting the Pieces in Place, Ex Occidente Press (Bucharest, Romania), 2009.
Literary Remains, PS Publishing (Hornsea, East Yorkshire), 2010.
Leave Your Sleep, PS Publishing (Hornsea, East Yorkshire), 2012.
Death Makes Strangers of Us All, Swan River Press (Dublin, Ireland), 2018.

Novellas
Bloody Baudelaire, Ex Occidente Press (Bucharest, Romania), 2009.
The Dark Return of Time, Swan River Press (Dublin, Ireland), 2014.
The Stones are Singing, PS Publishing (Hornsea, East Yorkshire), 2016.

Novels
She Sleeps, PS Publishing (Hornsea, East Yorkshire), 2017.
Waiting for the End of the World, PS Publishing (Hornsea, East Yorkshire), 2020.
Heaven's Hill, Zagava (Germany), 2021.

Collected Edition
Ghosts, Swan River Press (Dublin, Ireland), 2012. (Contains Putting the Pieces in Place and Bloody Baudelaire. Available with Ghosts CD in a limited edition.)

Non-fiction
Occult Territory: An Arthur Machen Gazetteer, Tartarus Press (Yorkshire), 2019.
Past Lives of Old Books and Other Essays, Tartarus Press (Yorkshire), 2020.
Sylvia Townsend Warner: A Bibliography, Tartarus Press (Yorkshire), 2020.
Robert Aickman: An Attempted Biography, Tartarus Press (Yorkshire), 2022.
Fifty Forgotten Books, And Other Stories (Sheffield), 2022.

Translation
Le Grand Meaulnes by Alain-Fournier, Tartarus Press (Horam, Sussex), 1999.

Music
Ghosts, Klanggalerie (Austria), 2012.
Bloody Baudelaire: A Soundtrack, Klanggalerie (Austria), 2014.
The Romance of Shortwave Radio Numbers Stations, Persepolis, 2016.
Copsford, (self released) 2020. Reissued Bladud Flies! 2021 Reissued Warm Noise 2022
Phantom Cities by The Sodality of the Shadows, Persepolis, 2020.
Heaven's Hill, 7" single, Zagava, 2012.

Film/video
Backgammon, 2016 (co-scriptwriter)
Coverdale: A Year in the Life, 2016 (co-director/producer)
Robert Aickman: Author of Strange Tales, 2015 (co-director/producer)
Current 93: Live at Halifax Minster, 2014 (co-director/producer)
Collecting Vinyl Records: A Personal History, 2012 (director/producer)
A Mild Case of Bibliomania, 2011 (director/producer)

Further reading
"An Interview with R. B. Russell", by John Kenny, Swan River Press Interviews May 2012.
"An Interview with R. B. Russell", by Jason Rolfe, Bibliomancy Tuesday, 7 February 2012.
"An Interview with Ray Russell", by Everett Bleiler, Fantasy Commentator, Winter 2001–2002, pps.97-100.
"Uncollected Characters of the Book World: 5", by Victoria Hyde-Greene, Antiquarian Book Monthly, May 1999, pps8-9.

References

External links
 R. B. Russell
 R.B. Russell interviewed (with Rosalie Parker) by Rick Kleffel at the Agony Column Podcast

Living people
English horror writers
World Fantasy Award-winning writers
Year of birth missing (living people)
English male novelists